The Ohiopyle Highway Bridge is a structure that carries two lanes of Pennsylvania Route 381 Youghiogheny River in Ohiopyle, Pennsylvania

The span, which opened in 1975, is the third to be located in the vicinity. An original 19th-century covered bridge was replaced by a Pratt truss bridge around 1900. Because of a low-clearance underpass located directly adjacent to its southern approach, this structure proved to be obsolete once the automobile replaced the train as the primary method of tourism in the years following World War II. Although already scheduled for replacement, the discovery of a major fatigue crack sealed the fate of this structure, leading the way for the present girder bridge to be erected.

See also 
 List of crossings of the Youghiogheny River

External links
Nat'l Bridge Inventory
Structural Report

Bridges in Fayette County, Pennsylvania
Bridges completed in 1975
Bridges over the Youghiogheny River
Girder bridges in the United States
Road bridges in Pennsylvania